Supermigration is the second studio album by Irish electronic duo Solar Bears. It was released in April 2013 under Planet Mu Records.

Track list

References

External links

2013 albums
Solar Bears (musical duo) albums